Jelenče is a small settlement in the Municipality of Pesnica in northeastern Slovenia. It lies in the western part of the Slovene Hills. The area is part of the traditional region of Styria. The entire municipality is now included in the Drava Statistical Region.

References

External links
Jelenče on Geopedia

Populated places in the Municipality of Pesnica